K VI was a  patrol submarine of the Royal Netherlands Navy. The ship was built by Fijenoord shipyard in Rotterdam.

Service history
The submarine was laid down in Rotterdam at the shipyard of Fijenoord on 4 April 1916. The launch took place on 23 December 1920.
On 11 October 1921 the ship was commissioned in the Dutch navy.

27 October 1921 K VI left the port of Den Helder for the Dutch East Indies her theater of operations. She made the journey without an escort. The route she took made stops at Port Said, the Suez Canal, Sabang to Surabaya, where she arrived on 31 January 1922.

In 1935 K VI was removed from active service and in August 1937 decommissioned.

References

External links
Description of ship

1920 ships
Ships built in Schiedam
K V-class submarines